Franciszek Macharski (20 May 1927 – 2 August 2016) was a Polish cardinal of the Roman Catholic Church. He was appointed Archbishop of Kraków from 1978, named by Pope John Paul II to succeed him in that role. Macharski was elevated to the cardinalate in 1979, and resigned as archbishop in 2005.

Early life
Franciszek Macharski was born on 20 May 1927 in  Kraków, Poland. He was the youngest of four children. During World War II he worked as a menial laborer and afterward entered the seminary in Kraków, where he also studied theology. He was ordained as a priest in April 1950 by Cardinal Adam Stefan Sapieha. Until 1956 he was a vicar in a parish near Bielsko-Biała and was then transferred to Fribourg, Switzerland, to continue his theological studies. He received his doctorate in 1960.

Vocation
Macharski was appointed Archbishop of Kraków in December 1978 by Pope John Paul II, who had been Archbishop of that city himself until his election to the Papacy in October 1978. Macharski was consecrated as a Bishop by John Paul II himself at the Vatican on 6 January 1979 and took possession of the Archdiocese of Kraków on 28 January 1979, when he was installed at Wawel Cathedral.

Archbishop Macharski was created Cardinal-Priest of San Giovanni a Porta Latina as his titular church in June 1979, the first consistory of John Paul II, just six months after his episcopal consecration. He was a member of the cardinal electors of the 2005 papal conclave that elected Joseph Alois Ratzinger as Pope Benedict XVI. He lost the right to vote in conclaves when he turned 80 in May 2007.

Macharski retired as Archbishop of Kraków on 3 June 2005. His successor was Pope John Paul II's private Secretary, Stanisław Dziwisz.

Death
Cardinal Macharski fell down the stairs of his home in June 2016. Pope Francis visited Macharski in a Kraków hospital on 28 July 2016, while Macharski was in a coma. He died five days later.

References

External links

1927 births
2016 deaths
Archbishops of Kraków
21st-century Polish cardinals
Recipients of the Legion of Honour
Commanders Crosses of the Order of Merit of the Federal Republic of Germany
Cardinals created by Pope John Paul II
20th-century Polish cardinals